Mendoncia puberula is a plant species in the family Acanthaceae (or according to some specialists in the family Mendonciaceae).

It is a climber with opposite, entire ovate leaves somewhat hairy abaxially, which renders the species its epithet.

The fruit is a drupe, resembling a dark grape. The flowers are surrounded by two bracts.

The species' native habitat are the Atlantic Forest and Cerrado of Brazil.

References
  CONAMA (1999) Resolução CONAMA Nº 261, de 30 de junho de 1999

puberula
Endemic flora of Brazil
Flora of the Atlantic Forest
Flora of the Cerrado